Henry Theodore Pierce (1913-1975) was a professional rugby league footballer who played for the Australia national team and the New South Wales team. He played his club football in the NSWRFL Premiership for Sydney clubs St. George and Eastern Suburbs.

Playing career
Pierce played for the St. George Dragons for two seasons in 1932 and 1933 and for Eastern Suburbs for eleven seasons between 1934 and 1944. He won three straight premierships between 1935 and 1937 with the Tricolours. He won his fourth premiership with the Easts in the 1940 Grand Final. He scored a total of 60 tries during his long and successful club career. The speedy backrower also played in five test matches for Australia in 1937/38. He is listed on the Australian Players Register as Kangaroo No. 216. Pierce also played for City Firsts and New South Wales on six occasions between 1937 and 1943.

While playing football, Pierce also served in the New South Wales Police Force and in 2008, rugby league's centennial year in Australia, he was named as a reserve in a NSW Police team of the century.

Death
He died at Bondi, New South Wales on 12 December 1975, 41 days short of his 63rd birthday.

References

 The Encyclopedia Of Rugby League Players; Alan Whiticker & Glen Hudson

1913 births
Australian police officers
Australian rugby league players
Sydney Roosters players
St. George Dragons players
Australia national rugby league team players
New South Wales rugby league team players
City New South Wales rugby league team players
1975 deaths
Rugby league second-rows
Rugby league players from Sydney